When Pop Culture Saved America is an American documentary dealing with how American culture helped the country deal with the 9/11 terrorist attacks on the United States. Produced by David P. Levin, the film consists of interviews with stars and personalities such as Kristin Chenoweth, Idina Menzel, Denis Leary, Dan Rather, Regis Philbin, and Ray Romano. It was produced by Brainstorm, Inc. for The Biography Channel (now called FYI), as part of their remembrance of the attacks on their 10th anniversary. Which Entertainment Weekly cited as one of the 10 specials to watch on the tenth anniversary of the September 11 attacks.

The documentary
As the United States prepared to remember the terror attacks of September 11, 2001 on their tenth anniversary, many television networks developed specials. The Biography Channel (Bio), one of A&E Networks' channels prepared three to be aired in observance. with an additional production slated for the A&E channel. The three slated for Bio were: When Pop Culture Saved America, I Survived ... 9/11, and Beyond: Messages from 9/11; A&E's entry was Portraits from Ground Zero. The producer, David P. Levin, interviewed almost two dozen celebrities from the worlds of television, film, theater and music to show how those in the world of entertainment chose to help the nation heal after the attack. The documentary also delved into how the terrorist attacks changed pop culture on television and in films.

The show premiered on September 5, 2011, and was aired several more times over the following week, including a prime time airing on September 11, with its final showing the following day. The show utilized Alan Kalter as its narrator. In the run-up to the anniversary of the attacks, both the New York Times and Entertainment Weekly, named the documentary to their top 10 lists of shows to watch in commemoration of the terror attacks.

Highlighted in the documentary is Alan Jackson's performance of his post-9/11 song, "Where Were You (When the World Stopped Turning)". The documentary also featured how pop culture was changed and influenced by the events of 9/11, such as the creation of the play 110 Stories, a "docu-play" which follows the course of the day as seen through the lives of ordinary people who lived through it.

Appearances
The list of interviewees ran the gamut of the entertainment industry: theater, film, prime time and daytime television, and music.

 Danny Aiello
 Richard Belzer
 Kristin Chenoweth
 Billy Ray Cyrus
 Gilbert Gottfried
 Patricia Heaton
 Alan Jackson
 Paul McCartney
 Idina Menzel
 Dan Rather
 Tony Roberts
 Ray Romano
 Stelio Savante
 Bruce Springsteen
 Jon Stewart
 Steven Van Zandt
 Ben Vereen
 Max Weinberg
 David Zayas

References

External links
 When Pop Culture Saved America on Vimeo
 

American documentary films
Documentary films about the September 11 attacks
Documentaries about historical events